Devin Patrick Caherly (born March 17, 2001), is an American social media personality most known for his content on TikTok.

Life 
Devin Patrick Caherly was born on March 17, 2001, in Summit, New Jersey. A resident of Westfield, New Jersey, Caherly graduated from Westfield High School in 2019 and attends University of Arizona where he is majoring in entrepreneurship. Caherly is known for his POV TikTok posts. In May 2020, Caherly's wedding meme went viral. His duets with TikToker Tatayanna Mitchell have generated a following  on both of their accounts. In December 2020, by stating the name Charli D'Amelio 100,000 times, Caherly's post generated over a million views.

References 

Living people
Place of birth missing (living people)
American TikTokers
2001 births
People from Westfield, New Jersey
University of Arizona alumni
Westfield High School (New Jersey) alumni